Green Square railway station is located on the Airport line in the locality of Green Square. The station is situated at a five-way intersection which is the meeting point of the four suburbs, Alexandria, Zetland, Waterloo and Beaconsfield. It is served by Sydney Trains T8 Airport & South line services.

History
Green Square station opened on 21 May 2000 when the Airport line opened from Central to Wolli Creek. Like other stations on the line, Green Square was built and is operated by the Airport Link Company as part of a public–private partnership.

Prior to March 2011, passengers were required to pay an access fee to use the station. The access fee was removed after the State Government reached an agreement with the Airport Link Company to pay the fee at Green Square and Mascot stations on behalf of passengers. Patronage increased by around 70% at the two stations in the months following the removal of the fee. By 2018, patronage was growing at an annual rate of around 25 percent, leading to overcrowding at peak times.

Green Square station featured in the music video clip for Marvin Priest's "Own This Club".

Platforms & services

References

External links

 Green Square Station at Transport for New South Wales (Archived 10 June 2019)

Easy Access railway stations in Sydney
Railway stations located underground in Sydney
Railway stations in Australia opened in 2000
Waterloo, New South Wales
Airport Link, Sydney